Meanderthal is the second full-length studio album by American heavy metal band Torche. It was released on April 8, 2008.

Reception

In the January 2009 issue of Decibel Magazine, Meanderthal was ranked number 1 atop the list of the Top 40 Extreme Albums of 2008.

Track listing 

The Daymare Recordings release of the album includes the entire In Return EP as bonus tracks.

Personnel
Band members
Steve Brooks – guitars and vocals
Juan Montoya – guitars
Jonathan Nuñez – bass
Rick Smith – drums

Other personnel
Kurt Ballou – production, recording, engineering, mixing and additional guitars
Aaron Turner – cover artwork
Nick Zampiello – mastering

References

External links
Meanderthal at Discogs

Torche albums
2008 albums
Hydra Head Records albums
Albums with cover art by Aaron Turner
Albums produced by Kurt Ballou